Ade Chandra (born 4 February 1950) is a retired Chinese Indonesian badminton player.

Career
A doubles specialist of ample bulk by Indonesian standards, he was noted for his power and quick defensive reflexes. With the formidable Christian Hadinata he won numerous international men's doubles titles between 1972 and 1980, including a pair of All-England titles, though they were often runners-up to fellow countrymen Tjun Tjun and Johan Wahjudi at major events
. They were unbeaten in two Thomas Cup campaigns together (1973, 1976) both of which resulted in world team titles for Indonesia. Late in Chandra's career he won men's doubles with Christian at the 1980 IBF World Championships in Jakarta.

Achievements

Olympic Games (demonstration) 
Men's doubles

World Championships 
Men's doubles

World Cup 
Men's doubles

Asian Games 
Men's doubles

Asian Championships 
Men's doubles

Southeast Asian Games 
Men's doubles

International Open Tournaments (6 titles, 9 runners-up)
Men's doubles

Mixed doubles

Invitational Tournaments 

Men's doubles

References

Bibliography

Living people
1950 births
Sportspeople from Jakarta
Indonesian people of Chinese descent
Indonesian male badminton players
Badminton players at the 1972 Summer Olympics
Badminton players at the 1974 Asian Games
Badminton players at the 1978 Asian Games
Asian Games medalists in badminton
Asian Games gold medalists for Indonesia
Asian Games silver medalists for Indonesia
Medalists at the 1974 Asian Games
Medalists at the 1978 Asian Games